In 1797 the British East India Company (EIC) chartered a number of East Indiamen and country ships to serve as transport for a planned attack on Manila.

The vessels gathered at Penang in September and waited there. However, the Government cancelled the invasion following a peace treaty with Spain and the EIC released the vessels it had engaged.

The listing of EIC vessels comes from a report on claims by their captains for payment for their vessels' time.  The EIC held several vessels in India to support the expedition. There were eight regular ships: Lord Camden, Busbridge, Minerva, Lord Macartney, Lord Hawkesbury, Sir Stephen Lushington, Phoenix, and General Goddard. There were also three "dismantled ships": Pitt, Lascalles, and Royal Admiral. There were also some EIC "extra ships" on a voyage charter.

The captains of all the vessels sued the EIC for reimbursement for expenses consequent on the delay to their homeward bound journeys, and for the eight regular ships, the additional risks involved in the detours to Penang. In 1800 the court awarded six of the captains of the regular ship £750 each. The court further ordered that the officers of the vessels involved receive some payment.

EIC ships

Country ships
The list of the names of the country ships comes from a House of Commons Select Committee report. The charter costs and period come from the Bengal Journal (April 1798; p.614.)

In addition  was lost in the Hooghli River in July "going on an expedition".

Notes

Citations

References
  

Age of Sail merchant ships of England
Lists of sailing ships